John MacBurnie (December 18, 1892 – September 24, 1956) was an American cinematographer. He worked on more than a hundred films during his career.

Selected filmography
 Unaccustomed As We Are (1929)
 Heart of Virginia (1948)
 Ghost of Zorro (1949)
 Bells of Coronado (1950)
 Tarnished (1950)
 Twilight in the Sierras (1950)
 Code of the Silver Sage (1950)
 Harbor of Missing Men (1950)
 Women from Headquarters (1950)
 Salt Lake Raiders (1950)
 Trial Without Jury  (1950)
 California Passage (1950)
 The Dakota Kid (1951)
 Colorado Sundown (1952)
 Tropical Heat Wave (1952)
 Down Laredo Way (1953)

References

Bibliography
 Robert W. Phillips. Roy Rogers: A Biography. McFarland, 1995.

External links

1892 births
1956 deaths
American cinematographers